Adriana Sivieri (born 21 June 1918) is an Argentine-born Italian retired film actress. She also worked in radio and as a voice actor, dubbing foreign films for release in Italy.

Selected filmography
 Vanity (1947)
 Bitter Rice (1949)
 At the Edge of the City (1953)

References

Bibliography 
 Bertellini, Giorgio. The Cinema of Italy. Wallflower Press, 2004.

External links 
 

1918 births
Argentine emigrants to Italy
Argentine film actresses
Italian film actresses
People from Buenos Aires
Possibly living people